Clelia may refer to:
Clelia (given name) (includes a list of people with the name)
Cloelia, a legendary Roman figure
Clelia curve, an algebraic curve
Clelia (snake genus), a genus of snakes